Xavier X. Sala i Martín (also Sala-i-Martin in English) is a Spanish-born Catalan-American economist and professor of economics at Columbia University. Sala i Martin is one of the leading economists in the field of economic growth.

Born in Cabrera de Mar, Catalonia, Sala i Martin earned a degree in economics from the Autonomous University of Barcelona in 1985. He completed his PhD in economics from Harvard University in 1990.

In addition to working at Columbia, he has been a professor at Yale University, Harvard University, and the Universitat Pompeu Fabra in Barcelona and the Barcelona Graduate School of Economics, where he usually visits for a term every summer.

Professional work
Sala i Martin is one of the leading economists in the field of economic growth and is consistently ranked among the most-cited economists in the world for works produced in the 1990s. His works include the topics of economic growth, development in Africa, monetary economics, social security, health and economics, convergence, and classical liberal thinking, with his book Liberal Economics for Non-Economists and Non-Liberals. The "liberal" in the title should be understood in the classic liberal/libertarian sense.

He has constructed an estimate of the world distribution of income, which he has then used to estimate poverty rates and measures of inequality. The conclusions of this study offered a new point of view for two reasons. Firstly, the United Nations and the World Bank used to believe that although poverty rates were falling, the total number of poor people was increasing. He claimed that both were falling. Secondly, the United Nations and the World Bank believe that individual income inequalities were on the rise. He claimed that they were not.

Sala i Martin is the author of the economic growth textbook Apuntes de Crecimiento Economico and the co-author (with Robert Barro) of the textbook Economic Growth.

Sala i Martin and Elsa V. Artadi are the authors of the Global Competitiveness Index, used since 2004 for the Global Competitiveness Report, an index published by the World Economic Forum that ranks 142 countries by their level of economic competitiveness.

He often collaborates with Catalan media to support the independence of Catalonia from Spain. In 2014 he had a public confrontation with Jose Manuel Durão Barroso, the president of the European Commission, reproaching him the lack of support towards a democratic resolution of the conflict between Spain and Catalonia.

Other activities
Sala i Martin was a board member at FC Barcelona and treasurer of the club between 2004 and 2010. He was the president of the club during the electoral process of 2006.

He is the founder of Umbele: A Future for Africa, a nonprofit organization that promotes economic development in Africa.

He is a columnist for the Spanish newspaper La Vanguardia. He makes weekly appearances on the Catalan radio network RAC 1 and in the television show Divendres. He also contributes to CNN.

He supports Catalan independence and gives conferences around Catalonia, in name of the pro-independence association that he and other university teachers created for that purpose, (Col·lectiu Wilson).

Prizes
He has been recognized with a Distinguished Teacher in Graduate Economics award three times at Columbia and Yale, with the 2004 King Juan Carlos I Prize (a biannual prize given to the best economist in Spain and Latin America), and the 2006 Lenfest Prize awarded to the best teacher at Columbia University.

On 15 January 2017, Martin was listed by UK-based company Richtopia at number 14 in the list of 100 Most Influential Economists.

Works
 
 
 Sala-i-Martin, Xavier; Pinkovsky, Maxim (March 2010). African poverty is falling ... much faster than you think!, NBER Working Paper Nr. 15775, National Bureau of Economic Research, Cambridge, Massachusetts, USA.

References

External links

 Personal home page of Xavier Sala-i-Martin
 Umbele

1962 births
Living people
Growth economists
Economists from Catalonia
Harvard University alumni
Harvard University faculty
Columbia University faculty
Academic staff of Pompeu Fabra University
American people of Catalan descent
American libertarians
Autonomous University of Barcelona alumni